Ōhashi, Ohashi or Oohashi (written: 大橋 lit. "large bridge") is a Japanese surname. Notable people with the surname include:

Akira Ohashi (born 1968), Japanese actor
Ayaka Ohashi (born 1994), Japanese voice actress
Kyosen Ōhashi (born 1934), Japanese TV host and writer
Hideyuki Ohashi (born 1965), former Japanese professional boxer
Hiroyoshi Ohashi (born 1936), botanist formerly at the University of Tokyo and Tohoku University
Katelyn Ohashi (born 1997), American artistic gymnast
Kenichirō Ōhashi (born 1982), Japanese voice actor, and singer
Kenzo Ohashi (born 1934), former Japanese football player
Kyosen Ōhashi (born 1934), Japanese TV host and writer
Masaharu Ōhashi (born 1947), Justice of the Supreme Court of Japan
Masahiro Ohashi (born 1981), Japanese football player
Mayumi Ōhashi (born 1966), Japanese manga artist
Nozomi Ohashi (born 1999), retired Japanese child actress and singer
Rene Ohashi, Canadian cinematographer
 Takahiro Ōhashi, Japanese shogi player
Tsutomu Ōhashi (born 1933), Japanese artist and scientist
Tsuyoshi Ōhashi (born 1972), Japanese manga artist
, Japanese swimmer

See also
Sanjō Ōhashi, a bridge in Kyoto

Japanese-language surnames